Dan Santucci (born September 6, 1983) is a former American football center. He was drafted by the Cincinnati Bengals in the seventh round of the 2007 NFL Draft. He played college football at Notre Dame.

Early years
Santucci attended St.Patrick High School in Chicago where he played both Defensive End and Tight End. In his last two years he made 120 tackles and 14 sacks as well as catching 38 passes for 475 yards and seven touchdowns.  He also went to St. Francis Borgia grammar school.

College career
Santucci attended the University of Notre Dame where he played college football in NCAA Division One. He was then selected by the Cincinnati Bengals in the seventh round of the 2007 NFL draft.

Professional career

Cincinnati Bengals
Santucci was selected by the Cincinnati Bengals in the seventh round (230th overall) of the 2007 NFL Draft. He made his NFL debut at the Cleveland Browns on September 16.

Santucci was waived/injured on August 18, 2009, and subsequently reverted to injured reserve.

He was waived on July 22, 2010.

Kansas City Chiefs
Santucci signed with the Kansas City Chiefs for pre-season on August 7, 2010. Santucci was cut by the Kansas City Chiefs after the final pre-season game. 
 Carolina Panthers 
 He was signed to the Carolina Panthers practice squad and became a free agent after the season.

References

External links
Cincinnati Bengals bio

1983 births
Living people
Players of American football from Chicago
American football centers
American football offensive guards
Notre Dame Fighting Irish football players
Cincinnati Bengals players
Kansas City Chiefs players